Pamela Motley Verrall (13 August 1915 – 1996) was a Welsh composer and music educator.

Verrall was born in Penrhiwceiber, South Wales. Her father was a musician. Verrall attended the University of Wales, where she received a B.A. in music in 1937, and a B.A. in English, German, and Latin in 1938. She also earned a Licentiate of the Royal Academy of Music (LRAM) in London.

Verrall acted as head of the music departments in various schools in the South East of England, including Aldershot Manor Secondary School, The Winston Churchill School, Woking (mid-1970s), Elmhust Ballet School, Camberley and St. Catherine's School for Girls, Twickenham. She composed at least 90 sacred and secular songs, as well as chamber music and musicals for children which have been performed on radio and television. Her compositions and arrangements for school ensembles were published by Bosworth, Chester Music (now Wise Music), Cramer & Company, Feldman, and Forsyth Publishing. Her works include:

Chamber 

Clarinets in Chorus
Clarinets in Concert
Seven Romances (clarinet and piano)
Six Conversations (clarinet and piano)
Six Dance Duets (recorder and piano)
Six Miniatures for Recorders
 The Well Tempered Wind Quartet, Bach arrangements for flute, oboe, clarinet and bassoon
Woodwind Trio (oboe, clarinet and bassoon)

Theatre 

Around the World: Francis Drake
Babushka (Christmas Play)
Gingerbread Man
Grand Tour of Europe
Johnny Appleseed, for narrator, chorus, dancers and mimersLegend of the Yellow RiverMiracle ManMove Over, Mr. NoahSea SpellSilver ArrowSon of AssisiSummer Water Vocal 
 Cross over the Road'' (hymn)
at least 90 songs

References 

Welsh composers
British women musicians
1915 births
1996 deaths
Alumni of the University of Wales
Alumni of the Royal Academy of Music